Isaac Newton Power (March 16, 1852 – May 5, 1916) was an American politician in the state of Washington. He served in the Washington House of Representatives from 1889 to 1891.

References

Republican Party members of the Washington House of Representatives
1852 births
1916 deaths
People from Olympia, Washington
19th-century American politicians
People from Island County, Washington